Sang Run State Park is a public recreation area covering  in Sang Run, Garrett County, Maryland. Focal points of the state park are a homestead, Friends Delight, that dates from the early 1800s, and the historic Friends Store, which as a center of Sang Run's community life sold various staples and served as post office until the 1970s. The park offers picnicking, hiking trail, and put-in for Class V whitewater rafting on the Youghiogheny River.

References

External links
Sang Run State Park Maryland Department of Natural Resources

State parks of Maryland
Parks in Garrett County, Maryland
Protected areas established in 2017
2017 establishments in Maryland